Kapawe'no 150D, formerly known as Pakashan 150D, is an Indian reserve of the Kapawe'no First Nation in Alberta, located within Big Lakes County. It is 13 kilometres northwest of Lesser Slave Lake. In the 2016 Canadian Census, it recorded a population of 5 living in 4 of its 7 total private dwellings.

References

Indian reserves in Alberta